The Walkers may refer to:

The Walkers (Danish band)
The Walkers (Dutch band)
The Walker Brothers, an American pop group of the 1960s and 1970s

See also
 The WalkerZ, a YouTube web series
Walkers (disambiguation)
Walker (disambiguation), including "The Walker"